Trishna is a 2011 drama film, written and directed by Michael Winterbottom, and starring Freida Pinto and Riz Ahmed. A British-Swedish-Indian co-production, it is an adaptation of Thomas Hardy's 1891 novel Tess of the d'Urbervilles. It is Winterbottom's third Hardy adaptation, after Jude and The Claim. The film premiered at the Toronto International Film Festival on 9 September 2011, and after some further festival appearances it saw its first cinema release in the United Kingdom and Ireland on 9 March 2012.

Plot

Based on Thomas Hardy's classic novel Tess of the D'Urbervilles, Trishna tells the story of a woman whose life is destroyed by the restrictions of social status, complications of love and life, and her development as an individual. Set in contemporary Rajasthan, Trishna meets a wealthy British businessman, Jay Singh, who has come to India to work in his father's hotel business. He sees her dancing at a hotel, and is attracted to her beauty and innocence.

After an accident destroys her father's Jeep and leaves her family without the means to support themselves, Trishna, approached with an offer of employment from Jay, accepts and begins her work beneath him.

Jay develops an attraction toward Trishna, expressing it through special treatment and gifts. She is overwhelmed by his generosity and his position of power, and does not know how to respond. After a night out with friends, Jay tracks her down and rescues her from two men harassing her on the street. However, instead of taking her back to the servant quarters of the hotel, he stops in a wooded area and makes an advance. It is implied that he rapes her, when she returns from their encounter crying heavily. She flees the next morning back to her family. An unwanted pregnancy results, and Trishna has an abortion, hoping to put the entire episode behind her and continue in her family as if she'd never left. However, her father's shame over her pregnancy and the family's need for income means that she is sent to work for her aunt and uncle, serving her bed-bound aunt and also working in the small factory her uncle runs. To her dismay, Jay tracks her down again and seems surprised that she has not tried to contact him; due to his own abusive, self-indulgent tendencies, he views the rape as a consensual sexual experience. He offers her the opportunity to be his live-in girlfriend in Mumbai, and Trishna chooses to go with him, escaping the drudgery of factory work to start life again with Jay in the city.

In Mumbai, Trishna gets to accompany Jay to events relating to the film industry, in which he is interested in investing as a producer. She begins dance classes, and is strikingly good, but Jay refuses to allow her to pursue dancing as a career. He tries to convince her (and seems to succeed) that she does not want to be a dancer and that she is to stay at his side. At their home, he is domineering and treats her subserviently, making it clear that she is to handle all domestic chores. Their relationship has settled into an arrangement when Jay suddenly has to leave for England, where his father is in hospital after having a stroke. Shocked by the brush with mortality, Jay feels closer to Trishna, and confesses having slept with two other women in their social circles before she moved in with him. Feeling a level of trust with her patron/boyfriend, Trishna confesses to him about her pregnancy and abortion. He reacts by asking her why she didn't think he had a right to know and gets progressively angry about all the times she could have told him about it. With difficulties at their highest, Jay abandons Trishna and stops paying the lease on their apartment. Trishna, having heard nothing from Jay, moves in with some of her friends from dance class in their apartment. To her surprise Jay returns to meet her, though he pretends it was all a misunderstanding and that she should have told him that the lease was not being paid. Meanwhile, a dance coordinator informs her that to begin a career as a dancer, she'd have to spend 30,000 rupees on a special card and money the dance coordinator offers to loan her. Stuck between going into debt with a stranger and the Jay, the "lesser of two evils," she chooses to return to Jay. His father's incapacitated state means Jay has to return to the idyllic hotel in Rajasthan.  He offers her a job at his hotel where he promises to maintain their relationship in secret.

Jay treats her as a servant in public, which for him adds some titillating thrill to their sexual encounters. But Jay's boredom, frustration, and return to an extremely dominant position exacerbates the power dynamic that already plagued their interactions. Jay's desire for control becomes ever more overt. He begins to imagine himself as the raja of this hotel that was once a castle, taking up residence in the rooms the ruler had once occupied and forcing Trishna to serve him. He becomes increasingly abusive and sexually coercive, until Trishna becomes a mere object for his sexual and emotional exploitation. After months of this, Trishna, her spirit destroyed and her hopes for opportunity in tatters, takes a kitchen knife and, while Jay is sleeping, stabs him to death as he wakes and looks at her in surprise.

Trishna escapes and returns to her family's village, where her mother and younger siblings receive her happily but her father continues to treat her coldly. At first she appears to be leading a normal life, but in the tragic climax Trishna finds an isolated spot and commits suicide by stabbing herself with the same kitchen knife used to kill Jay.

Main cast

Production
The film was produced by Winterbottom's production company Revolution Films in co-production with Film i Väst and Bob Film Sweden, and in association with Anurag Kashyap Films. It received financial support from the UK Film Council and the Swedish Film Institute. Filming took place in Jaipur, Rajasthan.

Soundtrack

Track listing

Reception
Trishna received mixed reviews. David Gritten in the Daily Telegraph wrote that, "The film looks splendid, and its incisive score by Shigeru Umebayashi, with a lovely mournful waltz theme, propels the story all the way to its unhappy climax. Yet Trishna feels faintly unsatisfying, leaving a sense of opportunities missed and details not quite thought through." Film critic Roger Ebert wrote "Winterbottom is a director who never repeats himself, films all over the world, and in "Trishna," effortlessly embeds his story in modern India". Joe Morgenstern of The Wall Street Journal thought that the film was "spectacular visually, though awfully somber dramatically". , the film holds a 63% approval rating on the review aggregator Rotten Tomatoes, based on 92 reviews with an average rating of 6.07/10. For the academic reception of Trishna, see Mendes (2016).

The film was nominated for Best Film at the London Film Festival, for Tokyo Grand Prix at the Tokyo International Film Festival, and for Politiken's Audience Award at CPH:PIX in Copenhagen.

References

External links
  
 
 

2011 drama films
2011 films
British drama films
Films based on Tess of the d'Urbervilles
Films directed by Michael Winterbottom
Films shot in India
Films set in Rajasthan
Films scored by Shigeru Umebayashi
English-language Swedish films
English-language Indian films
British Indian films
Indian drama films
2010s British films